Tommy Ryan (born Joseph Youngs; March 31, 1870 – August 3, 1948) was an American World Welterweight and World Middleweight boxing champion who fought from 1887 to 1907.  His simultaneously holding records in both weight classes was a rare and impressive feat for a boxer. His record is a topic that has been up for debate for decades. As of May 2021, Boxrec.com lists his official record as 82–2–13 (68KO). The International Boxing Hall of Fame lists his record as 86–3–6 (22KO). Others list his record anywhere from 86–3–6 (68KO), to 90–6–11 (70KO), to 84–2–11 (70KO). Some historians have even speculated that he held closer to 90 knockouts. Ryan was posthumously inducted into the International Boxing Hall of Fame in the class of 1991.

Boxing career
Ryan was considered by many one of the greatest Middleweights in boxing history. He was the World Middleweight Champion from 1898 to 1906. Some of his opponents included Mysterious Billy Smith, Kid McCoy, Tommy West, and Jack Bonner. After his retirement as a fighter he became a boxing teacher and coach. He was credited with helping devise the crouching technique for defense. During his career of 97 fights he won 82 (70 by knockout), lost 2, with 13 draws. Ryan was considered an excellent boxer-puncher and nearly unbeatable for his time.

Ryan first won the welterweight title in a match with Mysterious Billy Smith on July 26, 1894.  He was knocked out by Kid McCoy in the 15th round on March 2, 1896.  This bout forms part of the lore of the McCoy legend.  McCoy served as a sparring partner for Ryan, and absorbed many beatings at the hands of his employer.  Ryan was notorious for showing little mercy to his sparring partners.
 As a result, McCoy hated Ryan, and sought revenge. It is alleged that McCoy, who appeared thin, pale and frail, persuaded Ryan that he was seriously ill before their fight. McCoy, who was famed as a trickster, purportedly rubbed flour on his face so as to appear deathly ill.  Ryan is said to have fallen for the ruse, failed to train properly and was not in top condition for the bout.  Whether true or not, McCoy scored an upset win over Ryan in the non-title match.

In November 1941, Ryan accepted the position of boxing instructor at the Multnomah Athletic Club. A month later, he resigned the position and told The Oregonian, "I don't think I would have come west had I known that professional boxing was barred in the states of Washington and Oregon. There is too much money in other sections of the country for me to stick here at a $150 job".

Ryan was also instrumental in the career of heavyweight champion James J. Jeffries.  In fact, Ryan is credited with changing Jeffries' stance and teaching him to fight out of a crouch.  Ryan also seconded James J. Corbett in his second attempt to wrest the heavyweight crown from Jeffries.  Corbett however, blamed Ryan's strategy for his defeat. In 2003, Ryan was listed in The Ring magazine's list of 100 greatest punchers of all time.

Ryan died on August 3, 1948, aged 78.

Professional boxing record
All information in this section is derived from BoxRec, unless otherwise stated.

Official record

All newspaper decisions are officially regarded as “no decision” bouts and are not counted in the win/loss/draw column.

Unofficial record

Record with the inclusion of newspaper decisions in the win/loss/draw column.

See also
Lineal championship
List of welterweight boxing champions
List of middleweight boxing champions

References

External links

Ryan's Record at Cyber Boxing Zone

|-

|-

1870 births
1948 deaths
Bare-knuckle boxers
Middleweight boxers
American male boxers
People from Jefferson County, New York
Boxers from New York (state)